Paradisanthus is a genus of flowering plants from the orchid family, Orchidaceae. It contains 4 known species, all endemic to Brazil.

Paradisanthus bahiensis Rchb.f.
Paradisanthus micranthus (Barb.Rodr.) Schltr.
Paradisanthus mosenii Rchb.f.
Paradisanthus neglectus Schltr.

See also 
 List of Orchidaceae genera

References 

 Berg Pana, H. 2005. Handbuch der Orchideen-Namen. Dictionary of Orchid Names. Dizionario dei nomi delle orchidee. Ulmer, Stuttgart

 
Zygopetalinae genera
Orchids of Brazil